The Church of the Good Shepherd  is an historic Episcopal church building located at 715 Kirkman Street in Lake Charles, Calcasieu Parish, Louisiana, United States. Designed by noted Dallas architect C.W. Bulger in the Gothic Revival style of architecture, it was built of stone in 1896.

The church was added to the National Register of Historic Places on December 22, 1983  and was added as a contributing property to the Lake Charles Historic District at the time of its creation on March 16, 1990.

Current use
The Church of the Good Shepherd is an active parish in the Episcopal Diocese of Western Louisiana.

See also

National Register of Historic Places listings in Calcasieu Parish, Louisiana
Lake Charles Historic District
Church of the Good Shepherd (disambiguation)

References

External links
 Church of the Good Shepherd website
National register listings for Calcasieu Parish

Churches on the National Register of Historic Places in Louisiana
Episcopal church buildings in Louisiana
Buildings and structures in Lake Charles, Louisiana
Gothic Revival church buildings in Louisiana
Churches completed in 1896
19th-century Episcopal church buildings
Charles William Bulger buildings
Churches in Calcasieu Parish, Louisiana
National Register of Historic Places in Calcasieu Parish, Louisiana
Individually listed contributing properties to historic districts on the National Register in Louisiana
1896 establishments in Louisiana